Garden Expo North Station, is a transfer station on Line 6 and Line 7 of the Wuhan Metro. It entered revenue service on December 28, 2016. It is located in Dongxihu District and it is the northern terminus of Line 7.

Station layout

Gallery

References

Wuhan Metro stations
Line 6, Wuhan Metro
Line 7, Wuhan Metro
Railway stations in China opened in 2016